Paul Brightwell is an English actor and director. He has acted in many different plays, films and TV shows since the late 1980s. Theatre direction includes the British premieres of Heiner Muller's Hamletmachine at the Gate Notting Hill, and Witkiewicz's They at the Polish Theatre in Hammersmith.

Early life and career
Brightwell's first main role was as Uriah Heep in the TV Series David Copperfield in 1986. He went on to have parts in films and television shows, including Coronation Street.

In Titanic, Brightwell played Quartermaster Robert Hichens, the crew member who was at the ship's wheel at the time of RMS Titanic's impact with the iceberg which sank it.

Brightwell has guest starred in The Bill in a number of episodes. His longest recurring role is as DS Hall in the TV series, The Commander, which he has played throughout the 2000s. He also played the role of Malchus in the 2013 mini series The Bible, and Mr. Hickfang in the 2014 film The Voices.

Filmography

External links

References
 

Living people
English male film actors
English male television actors
Year of birth missing (living people)
English male stage actors
20th-century English male actors
21st-century English male actors